This is a list of volcanic eruptions from Kīlauea, an active shield volcano in the Hawaiian Islands that is currently erupting. These eruptions have taken place from pit craters and the main caldera, as well as parasitic cones and fissures along the East and Southwest rift zones. They are generally fluid (VEI-0) Hawaiian eruptions, but more violent eruptions have occurred throughout Kīlauea's eruptive history, with the largest recorded explosive eruption having taken place in 1790.

Eruptions during the Common Era
Data obtained from the Global Volcanism Program website.

Eruptions Before the Common Era
Data obtained from the Global Volcanism Program website.

References

Eruptions
Kilauea
Kilauea
Kilauea
Kilauea
Kilauea
Kilauea
Kilauea
Kīlauea eruptions